Flemington was a former station on the Central Railroad of New Jersey's South Branch in Flemington, New Jersey. The South Branch ran from a wye west of Manville–Finderne station to Flemington. Service at the station began on July 1, 1864 and passenger service was discontinued on April 25, 1953. The station currently serves as a branch of a local bank.

References 

Former Central Railroad of New Jersey stations
Railway stations in the United States opened in 1864
Railway stations closed in 1953
Former railway stations in New Jersey
Flemington, New Jersey
1864 establishments in New Jersey